Pearl Necklace (1974–1991) was an American Thoroughbred racing mare bred and raced by Reginald N. Webster. She was sired by Ambernash, a son of U.S. Racing Hall of Fame inductee, Nashua, and her dam was Another Jane, a daughter of Traffic Judge, a top runner whose wins included the Woodward Stakes and the Metropolitan and Suburban Handicaps.

Racing career
Trained by Roger Laurin, Pearl Necklace raced for four years from 1976 through 1979. At age three she won the Long Island Handicap and Gazelle Handicap and at four the important Maskette Stakes and the New York Handicap but had her best year at age five when she captured the Flower Bowl, Geisha, Shuvee, Hempstead, and Diana Handicaps.

Broodmare
Pearl Necklace was bred to several top horses such as Alydar, His Majesty, Lyphard and Conquistador Cielo, among others. However, none met with racing success.

References

1974 racehorse births
1991 racehorse deaths
Thoroughbred family 19-a
Racehorses bred in Maryland
Racehorses trained in the United States